Stick or the stick may refer to:

Thin elongated objects
 Twig
 The weapon used in stick fighting
 Walking stick, a device to facilitate balancing while walking
 Shepherd's crook
 Swagger stick
 Digging stick
 Swizzle stick, used to stir drinks

Sports
 Bandy stick, used in bandy
 Cue stick, used in pool, snooker and carom billiards
 Hockey stick, used in hockey
 Field hockey stick
 Ice hockey stick
 Lacrosse stick, used in lacrosse
 The rods, called "the sticks" used to measure distance by the chain crew in American football

Music
 Drum stick, used to strike drums
 Part of a bow used to play a string instrument
 Chapman Stick, an electric musical instrument in the guitar family
 Percussion stick, a struck percussion instrument
 Led Zeppelin IV, a 1971 album sometimes referred to as Sticks
 The Sticks (album), a 2012 album by Canadian band Mother Mother
 Sticks, a 2019 EP by Bish included within the album Carrots and Sticks
 "The Sticks", a track from the 1966 Cannonball Adderley Quintet album Cannonball in Japan

Transportation
 Stick or stick shift, an automobile's manual transmission
 Gear stick, used in a manual transmission-equipped automobile to change gears
 Control or centre stick, an aircraft cockpit arrangement

Geography
 Boondocks, also called "the sticks", a remote area
 Candlestick Park, a defunct stadium in San Francisco, nicknamed "The Stick"

Fiction
 Stick (comics), the teacher of Daredevil and Elektra in Marvel Comics
 Stick (novel), a 1983 novel by Elmore Leonard
 "Sticks" (short story), a 1974 short story by Karl Edward Wagner

Film and TV
 Sticks (film), a 2001 film starring Justina Machado and Lillo Brancato
 Stick (film), a 1985 Burt Reynolds film
 The Stick, a 1987 film directed by Darrell Roodt
 Stick (comics), a Marvel Comics character
 Stick Stickly, a Nickelodeon character
 Stick Bernard, protagonist of the anime series Genesis Climber MOSPEADA
 Sticks the Badger, a character from the 2014 TV series Sonic Boom

People
 Stick Elliott (1934–1980), American stock car driver
 Stephen Kernahan (born 1963), Australian footballer nicknamed "Sticks"
 Gene Michael (born 1938), American baseball player nicknamed "Stick"
 Norm Provan (born 1932), Australian former rugby league footballer and coach nicknamed "Sticks"
 Easton Stick (born 1995), American football quarterback
 Jan Stick, 21st century Canadian politician
 Josh Stick (born 1980), New Zealand former footballer
 Leonard Stick (1892–1979), Canadian politician
 Mzwandile Stick (born 1984), South African rugby union player and coach

Food
 Pretzel sticks, pub snacks
 Breadstick, dry baked bread
 Fish sticks, processed food
 Crab stick, seafood
 Mozzarella sticks, hors d'oeuvre
 Musk stick, confection
 Cinnamon sticks, spice

Other uses
 Stick (punishment), a rod used for corporal punishment
 Stick (unit), several units of measurement
 Stick, a British slang term for abuse, insult, or denigration
 A group of paratroopers in a single aircraft
 A group of soldiers corresponding to a section

See also
 
 Stick style, a late-19th-century American architectural style
 Sticking (disambiguation)
 Stik, British graffiti artist
 Styx (disambiguation)
 Sticky (disambiguation)

Lists of people by nickname
de:Stock